Community of Peace Academy (CPA) is a chartered public school located in the East Side of Saint Paul, Minnesota, United States. Founded in 1995 by Dr. Karen Rusthoven, this former K-5 school has now grown to be a PreK-12 school with around 800 students. The school participates in the University of Minnesota's College in the Schools program.

Student Demographics

Community of Peace Academy serves a diverse population of around 800 students. According to the 2018 Minnesota Report Card published by the Minnesota Department of Education, 41.8% of the students at CPA are Asian, 24.7% are Hispanic or Latino, 23.5% are Black or African American,  and 8.3% are White. 86.5% of students qualify for free or reduced-cost meals, and 25.3% are English Language Learners.

References

1995 establishments in Minnesota
Charter schools in Minnesota
Educational institutions established in 1995
High schools in Saint Paul, Minnesota
Public elementary schools in Minnesota
Public middle schools in Minnesota
Public high schools in Minnesota